Oedina is a genus of flowering plants belonging to the family Loranthaceae.

Its native range is Tanzania to Zambia.

Species:

Oedina brevispicata 
Oedina congdoniana 
Oedina erecta 
Oedina pendens

References

Loranthaceae
Loranthaceae genera